Antron Brown (born March 1, 1976) is an American drag racing driver, currently driving the Matco Tools Top Fuel dragster for AB Motorsports in the NHRA Camping World Drag Racing Series. Brown is the first African American champion in drag racing history, winning the Top Fuel dragster championship in 2012, 2015 and 2016.

Early life 
Brown lived in Trenton, New Jersey until age six, when his family moved to his grandmother's 10-acre farm in rural Chesterfield Township, New Jersey following the death of his grandfather. His father Albert ran a septic tank service, and was a drag racer at the sportsman level.  Antron maintained the cars as a child and began racing motorcycles at age six and motocross at age 12, practicing on a course he built on the farm. He ran his first competitive drag race as a high school senior.

Brown studied at Northern Burlington County Regional High School before becoming a track star at Mercer County Community College in New Jersey as a sprinter and long jumper, graduating in 1997 with an associate's degree in business administration. After being offered a full scholarship to run track for Long Island University, he was contacted by football player Troy Vincent (married to Brown's cousin) who was starting a racing team.

Racing career
Brown raced in the NHRA's Pro Stock Motorcycle division from 1998 to 2007, running his first three years with Vincent's Team 23 Racing. Brown won 16 events in the motorcycle division, and had a best finish of 2nd in points in 2001 and 2006. In 2008 he switched to Top Fuel dragsters. Brown won the Top Fuel championship in 2012, 2015 and 2016. As of the end of the 2022 season, Brown has 71 NHRA wins.

Personal life
Brown currently resides in Pittsboro, Indiana with his wife Billie Jo and three children, Anson, Adler, and Arianna. He is also an extremely devout Christian.

Notable: Ran quick enough in the 100-meter dash to qualify for the U.S. Olympic Trials in 1997.

In popular culture
Brown had an appearance as an appraiser in episode 8 ("The Fast and The Curious") of the third season of the A&E reality show Storage Wars.  He also appeared in episode 3 of Idris Elba: No Limits as Elba's drag racing instructor.  He now co-hosts Top Gear America with Tom Ford and William Fichtner.  Brown featured in the fifteenth season of Discovery's Wheeler Dealers, where he faced off against a 1965 Barracuda driven by Ant Antstead.

Crypto currency 
On October 7, 2022 the NHRA Coin Antron Brown Edition NFT became available on the OpenSea NFT Marketplace.

References

External links

NHRA COIN

Racing drivers from New Jersey
Living people
Dragster drivers
African-American racing drivers
People from Chesterfield Township, New Jersey
Sportspeople from Trenton, New Jersey
1976 births
African-American Christians
Mercer County Community College alumni
21st-century African-American sportspeople
20th-century African-American sportspeople